Chiu Keng Wan Shan is a hill that lies between the communities of Yau Tong and Tiu Keng Leng, Hong Kong.

Geography
Chiu Keng Wan Shan is 247m in height. To the south lies another hill called Devil's Peak. Junk Bay Chinese Permanent Cemetery is built on the east side of Chiu Keng Wan Shan.

Access
Parts of Wilson Trail Section 3 is built along the foot of Chiu Keng Wan Shan on the west side. It is possible to access the summit of Chiu Keng Wan Shan after walking up from O King Road, which is a road that runs between Chiu Keng Wan Shan and nearby Black Hill.

See also
 List of mountains, peaks and hills in Hong Kong
 Black Hill, Hong Kong
 Devil's Peak, Hong Kong
 Lam Tin
 Tiu Keng Leng
 Wilson Trail

References

External links

 Wilson Trail No.3

Mountains, peaks and hills of Hong Kong